Days of Wine and Roses and Other TV Requests is the eleventh studio album by American pop singer Andy Williams and was released in April 1963 by Columbia Records following his first season as host of his variety series, The Andy Williams Show. The LP has a studio recording of the closing theme from the show, "May Each Day", and continues the format of his previous Columbia releases by including songs from the 1920s ("When You're Smiling (The Whole World Smiles with You)"), 1930s ("Exactly Like You", "Falling in Love with Love"), 1940s ("It's a Most Unusual Day", "You Are My Sunshine"), and 1950s ("I Really Don't Want to Know").

The album made its first appearance on Billboard magazine's Top LP's chart in the issue dated April 20 of that year and remained on the album chart for 107 weeks, spending 16 consecutive weeks at number one. The album received Gold certification from the Recording Industry Association of America on September 19, 1963, becoming his first to do so, while his 1962 album Moon River and Other Great Movie Themes followed suit one month later.  For its release in the UK, the album was retitled Can't Get Used to Losing You and Other Requests, and it spent its only week on the album chart there at number 16 in 1965.

The single from the album, "Can't Get Used to Losing You," made its debut on the Billboard Hot 100 chart on March 7, 1963, eventually spending four weeks at number two during its 15-week stay. On the Easy Listening chart it spent four weeks at number one. Its B-side, "Days of Wine and Roses" reached number 26 on the Hot 100 and number nine, Easy Listening.

The album was released on compact disc for the first time (and under its UK title) by Sony Music Distribution in the mid-90s as tracks 1 through 12 on a pairing of two albums on one CD with tracks 13 through 24 consisting of Williams's Columbia album from October 1967, Love, Andy.    It was also released (under its original title) as one of two albums on one CD by Collectables Records on January 16, 2001, the other album being Williams's Columbia album from December 1966, In the Arms of Love. The Collectables CD was included in a box set entitled Classic Album Collection, Vol. 1, which contains 17 of his studio albums and three compilations and was released on June 26, 2001.

Track listing

Side one
 "Falling in Love with Love" from The Boys from Syracuse (Lorenz Hart, Richard Rodgers) – 2:13
 "I Left My Heart in San Francisco" (George Cory, Douglass Cross) – 3:06
 "You Are My Sunshine" (Jimmie Davis, Charles Mitchell) – 2:29
 "What Kind of Fool Am I?" from Stop the World – I Want to Get Off (Leslie Bricusse, Anthony Newley) – 3:22
 "When You're Smiling (The Whole World Smiles with You)" (Mark Fisher, Joe Goodwin, Larry Shay) – 1:44
 "Days of Wine and Roses" from Days of Wine and Roses (Henry Mancini, Johnny Mercer) – 2:48

Side two
 "It's a Most Unusual Day" from A Date with Judy (Harold Adamson, Jimmy McHugh) – 2:04
 "My Coloring Book" (Fred Ebb, John Kander) – 3:34
 "Can't Get Used to Losing You" (Jerome "Doc" Pomus, Mort Shuman) – 2:25
 "I Really Don't Want to Know" (Howard Barnes, Don Robertson) – 2:54
 "Exactly Like You" from the 1930 Broadway show Lew Leslie's International Revue (Dorothy Fields, Jimmy McHugh) – 1:59
 "May Each Day" from The Andy Williams Show (Mort Green, George Wyle) – 2:54

Grammy nominations

This album brought the third and fourth Grammy nominations that Williams received over the course of his career, with one in the category for Best Solo Vocal Performance, Male for the song "Days of Wine and Roses."  The winner was Jack Jones for "Wives and Lovers".  The other nomination was for the album itself in the category of Album of the Year, but the winner was The Barbra Streisand Album.

Song information

"When You're Smiling (The Whole World Smiles with You)" had its best chart performance as a number four hit recording for Seger Ellis & His Orchestra in 1928. Three different versions of "Exactly Like You" (from the 1930 Broadway show Lew Leslie's International Revue) made the charts in May 1930: Ruth Etting reached number 11 with the song; Harry Richman got up to number 12; and Sam Lanin & His Orchestra made it to number 19 with Smith Ballew on vocal. "Falling in Love with Love" originated in the 1938 musical The Boys from Syracuse and was first charted in 1939 by Frances Langford, who took the song to number 18.

"You Are My Sunshine" first appeared on the charts in 1940 when Wayne King & His Orchestra took the song to number 20, but the most successful chart run for the song belongs to Ray Charles, who went to number seven in 1962. "It's a Most Unusual Day" comes from the 1948 film A Date with Judy and was a number 21 hit that same year for Ray Noble & His Orchestra with Anita Gordon on vocal. "I Really Don't Want to Know" was a number 11 hit for Les Paul and Mary Ford in 1954.
"What Kind of Fool Am I?", from the 1961 musical Stop the World - I Want to Get Off, won the Grammy Award for Song of the Year and had its biggest chart success as a hit by Sammy Davis, Jr. that went to number 17 on the Billboard Hot 100 and number six Easy Listening.

Tony Bennett's 1962 recording of "I Left My Heart in San Francisco" won two Grammys (Record of the Year and Best Male Solo Vocal Performance) and peaked at number 19 on the Billboard Hot 100 and number seven Easy Listening. Henry Mancini's  recording of "Days of Wine and Roses" (from the 1962 film of the same name) won the Academy Award for Best Original Song and Grammy Awards for Record of the Year and Song of the Year. In 1963 Kitty Kallen's version of "My Coloring Book" made it to number 18 on the pop chart and number seven Easy Listening, and Sandy Stewart took the song to number 20 on the Hot 100 as well as number eight Easy Listening. "May Each Day" was the song that Williams used to close The Andy Williams Show each week from 1962 to 1967.

References

Bibliography

1963 albums
Andy Williams albums
Columbia Records albums